Alexa Forbes (born 2 April 1961) is a retired British rower who competed at the 1984 Summer Olympics.

Rowing career
Forbes was part of the eight, that won the national title rowing for Great Britain senior squad boat, at the 1981 National Championships. This led to selection for the 1981 World Rowing Championships in Munich. The following year she was part of the eight that won the national title, rowing for an A.R.A squad, at the 1982 National Rowing Championships. Subsequently she went to her second World Championships, rowing at the 1982 World Rowing Championships in Lucerne.

In 1984 she was selected to represent Great Britain in the women's eight event at the 1980 Olympics in Moscow. The team which consisted of Astrid Ayling, Ann Callaway, Gillian Hodges, Kate Holroyd, Belinda Holmes, Sarah Hunter-Jones, Kate McNicol and Sue Bailey (cox) finished in fifth place.

She represented England and won a gold medal in the lightweight coxless four, at the 1986 Commonwealth Games in Edinburgh, Scotland.

References

External links
 
 

1961 births
Living people
British female rowers
Olympic rowers of Great Britain
Rowers at the 1984 Summer Olympics
Sportspeople from Darlington
Commonwealth Games medallists in rowing
Rowers at the 1986 Commonwealth Games
Commonwealth Games gold medallists for England
Medallists at the 1986 Commonwealth Games